A copypasta is a block of text that is copied and pasted across the Internet by individuals through online forums and social networking websites. Copypastas are said to be similar to spam as they are often used to annoy other users and disrupt online discourse.

History 
The word "copypasta" was first used on Usenet groups in 2006.

Etymology 
The term "copypasta" is derived from the computer term "copy/paste", and can be traced back to an anonymous 4chan thread from 2006.

Examples

Navy Seal 
The Navy Seal copypasta is a lengthy, comically written, aggressive attack paragraph against a "kiddo", written in the voice of the stereotypical "tough guy", listing absurd accomplishments such as having "over 300 confirmed kills" and being "trained in gorilla  warfare". This copypasta is often reposted as a humorous overreaction to an insult and is thought to have originated in a post on a 4chan message board from 11 November 2010.

This copypasta is in the manifesto of the perpetrator of the Christchurch mosque shootings.

Bee Movie 

The Bee Movie copypasta started in 2013 when users posted its entire script onto websites such as Reddit and Tumblr. It was popularized when edits of the film were first uploaded to YouTube in late 2016.

"A Drive Into Deep Left Field by Castellanos" 

On 19 August 2020, during a Major League Baseball game between the Cincinnati Reds and Kansas City Royals, Reds broadcaster Thom Brennaman uttered a homophobic slur on a hot mic. Later in the broadcast, Brennaman apologized to listeners. Mid-apology, Nick Castellanos hit a home run, and Brennaman broke from his apology to deliver the play-by-play. Brennaman said, "I pride myself and think of myself as a man of faith, as there's a drive into deep left field by Castellanos, it will be a home run. And so that'll make it a 4-0 ballgame." The moment became an internet meme as a copypasta. ESPN's Pablo Torre later said it "was like listening to the band play on as the Titanic was sinking. Except the band was also somehow the iceberg."

Technology 
Copypasta can refer to a piece of code that was copy/pasted. Discussions of copypasta can be found in the code history of Linux, e.g.: "This very much looks like copypasta" (this looks like copy/pasted code and was not originally authored) and "Copypasta mistake" (this code was copy/pasted and not correctly amended).

See also 

 Creepypasta, brief, user-generated, paranormal stories intended to scare readers
 Chain letter
 Faxlore, similar content circulated by fax machine
 Know Your Meme, a website and video series which researches and documents the history of copypastas and similar content
 Running gag, a recurring joke
 Snowclone, a cliché and phrasal template that can be used and recognized in multiple variants
 Shitposting, the practice of posting intentionally low-quality or provocative content to troll or solicit reactions from others

References 

Internet memes
Internet manipulation and propaganda
2006 neologisms
Internet culture